Endre Senkálszky (2 October 1914 – 5 January 2014) was a Romanian actor and director.

Endre Senkálszky was an ethnic Hungarian. He died on 5 January 2014, aged 99, in his hometown of Cluj-Napoca.

References

1914 births
2014 deaths
Actors from Cluj-Napoca
Romanian people of Hungarian descent
Romanian male actors
Romanian film directors
Film people from Cluj-Napoca